Roord is a Dutch surname. Notable people with the surname include:

 Jill Roord (born 1997), Dutch football midfielder 
 Joke van der Leeuw-Roord (born 1949), Dutch historian

See also
 Rood (surname)

Dutch-language surnames